The 2017 African Judo Championships was the 38th edition of the African Judo Championships, organised by the African Judo Union. It took place in Antananarivo, Madagascar from 12–15 April 2017.

Medal overview

Men

Women

Medal table

Participating nations
There were a total of 181 participants from 22 nations.

References

External links
 

African Judo Championships
Judo, African Championships
African Championships
Antananarivo
Judo, 2017 African Championships
Judo in Madagascar
Judo, African Championships